Israel Wamiau (born 28 October 1994) is an Indonesian professional footballer who plays as a defender for Liga 2 club Persipura Jayapura.

Club career

Persipura Jayapura
He was signed for Persipura Jayapura to play in Liga 1 in the 2017 season. Wamiau made his professional debut on 7 May 2017 in a match against Persib Bandung at the Gelora Bandung Lautan Api Stadium, Bandung.

Arema
In 2018, Wamiau signed a contract with Indonesian Liga 1 club Arema. He made his league debut on 9 April 2018 in a match against Borneo at the Segiri Stadium, Samarinda.

Return to Persipura Jayapura
In 2019, it was confirmed that Israel Wamiau would re-join Persipura Jayapura, signing a year contract. Wamiau made his league debut on 23 August 2019 in a match against Barito Putera at the Demang Lehman Stadium, Martapura.

Persita Tengerang
Wamiau was signed for Persita Tangerang to play in Liga 1 in the 2022–23 season. He made his league debut on 14 August 2022 in a match against Persis Solo at the Indomilk Arena, Tangerang.

Career statistics

Club

References

External links 
 
 Israel Wamiau at Liga Indonesia

1995 births
Living people
Papuan people
People from Jayapura
Indonesian footballers
Persipura Jayapura players
Arema F.C. players
Persita Tangerang players
Liga 1 (Indonesia) players
Association football defenders
Sportspeople from Papua